Jaisalmer district is the largest district in the Indian state of Rajasthan, and the third largest district in India. Located in Marwar (Jodhpur Division), the city of Jaisalmer is the administrative headquarters of the district. As of the 2011 population census, it is the least populous district out of all 33 districts in Rajasthan.

Geography

With an area of 32,401sq km, Jaisalmer is the largest district in Rajasthan, and the third-largest in the country by area.

The Jaisalmer district lies in the Thar Desert, which straddles the border of India and Pakistan. It is bound in the northeast by Bikaner District, in the east by Jodhpur District, in the south by Barmer District, and in the west and north by Pakistan.

The district is located within a rectangle lying between 26°.4’ –28°.23' north parallel and 69°.20'-72°.42' east meridians.

Jaisalmer is almost entirely a sandy landscape, forming a part of the great Indian desert. The general aspect of the area is that of an interminable sea of sandhills, of all shapes and sizes, some rising to a height of almost . The hills in the west are covered with log bushes, while those in the east feature tufts of long grass. The climate is hot and dry. Throughout Jaisalmer crops such as bajra, jowar, motif, and til, are grown; spring crops of wheat and barley are very rare. Owing to the scant rainfall, irrigation is almost unknown except for small areas irrigated by lift canals of Indira Gandhi Canal Project.

Climate

Economy
In 2006, the Ministry of Panchayati Raj named Jaisalmer one of the country's 250 most backward districts (out of a total of 640). It is one of the twelve districts in Rajasthan currently receiving funds from the Backward Regions Grant Fund Programme (BRGF).

Demographics

According to the 2011 census, Jaisalmer district has a population of 669,919, roughly equal to the nation of Equatorial Guinea or the US state of North Dakota. This gives it a ranking of 508th in India (out of a total of 640). Its population growth rate over the decade 2001–2011 was 32.22%. Jaisalmer has a sex ratio of 849 females for every 1000 males, and a literacy rate of 58.04%. 13.29% of the population lives in urban areas. Scheduled Castes and Scheduled Tribes make up 14.80% and 6.33% of the population respectively.

Languages 

At the time of the 2011 census, 51.07% of the population spoke Rajasthani, 40.95% Marwari, 2.80% Hindi, 2.56% Sindhi and 1.02% Urdu as their first language. Marwari is the local language, while Dhatki and Sindhi is spoken in border areas and by Hindu refugees from nearby Thar regions of Sindh.

Administration
Jaisalmer district has four sub-divisions: Jaisalmer, Pokaran, Bhaniyana, and Fatehgarh. Jaisalmer and Pokaran are the nagar palikas, while 744 villages come under 140 gram panchayats. District developmental activities are being looked after by three panchayat samities, that is, Jaisalmer, Sam, and Sankra.

Tourism
Jaisalmer is one of the largest tourism district in Rajasthan. About 276,887 tourists visit the district every year, out of which about 100,000 tourists are foreigners. Some of the tourist attractions in Jaisalmer are:
 Jaisalmer Fort 
 Patwa Haveli
 Salim Singh's Haveli
 Nathmal's Haveli
Mehra Haveli
 Mandir Palace 
 Gadsisar Lake
 Government Museum
Tanot Mandir
Longewala
Pokharan
Thar desert
Bada Bagh
Lodhruva
Akal Wood Fossil Park
Ramdevra
Maru Udyan
Mohangarh

Every year, Maru Mahotsav is celebrated for the tourists. Ramdevra is also a big attraction for the Baba Ramdevji's pilgrims.

See also 
 Meharon Ki Dhani
 Rajkumari Ratnavati Girl's School, a school in the rural thar desert of Jaisalmer with unique architect
 Thar Desert
 Tharparkar

References

External links

 Official Website of Jaisalmer District

 
Districts of Rajasthan
Districts in Jodhpur division
Thar Desert